Sebastian Soresini (born 11 March 1968) is an Italian former professional tennis player.

Soresini reached a best singles ranking of 336 in the world. His ATP Tour main draw appearances included the 1991 Milan Indoor, where he was beaten in the first round by third-seed Andrei Chesnokov. He featured in the singles qualifying draw for the 1992 Wimbledon Championships.

References

External links
 
 

1968 births
Living people
Italian male tennis players